The Angostura Diversion Dam is a diversion dam on the Rio Grande in Sandoval County. New Mexico, near to Algodones and to the north of Bernalillo.
The dam diverts water into the main irrigation canal serving the Albuquerque Division.

The dam was built in 1934 by the Middle Rio Grande Conservancy District (MRGCD),
and in 1958 was rehabilitated by the United States Bureau of Reclamation and the Corps of Engineers 
as part of the Middle Rio Grande Project. 
Four  top-seal radial gates supply water to the Albuquerque Main Canal.
The MRGCD is responsible for operations and maintenance.

References
Citations

Sources

 
 

Dams in New Mexico
Buildings and structures in Sandoval County, New Mexico
Dams completed in 1934
United States local public utility dams
Dams on the Rio Grande
1934 establishments in New Mexico